This is an incomplete list of books about the Chernobyl nuclear disaster. Soon after the events of Chernobyl on April 26, 1986 generated global attention, numerous fiction and non-fiction titles have been published on the subject. Very early examples included a 1987 fiction book by science-fiction author Frederik Pohl, titled Chernobyl, while many famous non-fiction titles about Chernobyl were unwritten and unpublished until the fall of the Soviet Union in 1991. 

This list is not exhaustive and may not reflect all books, including recently-published, pre-released and self-published books.

Non-fiction
 Biohazard (1999) by Ken Alibek (discusses Chernobyl and the 1979 Sverdlovsk anthrax leak as two of many accidents that happened involving hazardous substances in the Soviet Union).
 Chernobyl 01:23:40 (2016) by Andrew Leatherbarrow (large account of the disaster from different perspectives of those who were involved).
 Midnight in Chernobyl (2019) by  Adam Higginbotham (reexamines the disaster using up-to-date reports and historical archives).
 Out of Chernobyl: A Girl Named Olga (2008) by Maureen A. White (memoir about raising a Chernobyl survivor named Olga, a young girl who immigrated to Canada and attended school in the province of Nova Scotia).
 The Nuclear Disaster at Chernobyl (1993) by Robin Cruise (short examination of the disaster, intended for public school education on the topic).
 The Truth About Chernobyl (1991) by Grigori Medvedev (first-hand testimony about the disaster; Medvedev worked at the Chernobyl Nuclear Power Plant and witnessed the accident).
 Visit Sunny Chernobyl (2012) by Andrew Blackwell (book about tourism in polluted places around the world, starting with Chernobyl).
 Voices from Chernobyl (1997) by Svetlana Alexievich (relates the psychological and personal tragedy of the Chernobyl accident, and explores the experiences of individuals and how the disaster affected their lives; was also part of the inspiration for the 2019 HBO TV miniseries Chernobyl.

Fiction
 Chernobyl (1987) by Frederik Pohl (fictional version of the disaster, based heavily on the true events as known at the time; Chernobyl was one of the first fiction titles to be published on the Chernobyl disaster).
 Chernobyl Murders (2008) by Michael Beres (political thriller set during the events of the Chernobyl disaster, featuring KGB operatives who want to cover up the event).
 Necromancy Cottage, Or, The Black Art of Gnawing On Bones (2019) by Rebecca Maye Holiday (Holly Eryngo Nemov is a Ukrainian by ethnicity, whose family relocated to Kadykchan in Russia after his parents were evacuated from Pripyat in 1986, after which Holly's mother, Alisa, died of leukemia). 
 Radiant Girl (2008) by Andrea White (coming-of-age novel following Katya Dubko, a Ukrainian eleven-year-old who lives near Chernobyl and believes that the power plant is a "magical factory" until the disaster changes her views).
 The Boy from Reactor 4 (2011) by Orest Stelmach (follows protagonist Nadia, who meets a Ukrainian ice hockey player named Adam who is ill from radiation poisoning, owing to his habit of going near the frozen cooling ponds next to the power plant).
 The Sky Unwashed (2000) by Irene Zabytko (follows a group of elderly women and their efforts to reclaim their homeland by farming after being forced by the government to evacuate it during the Chernobyl disaster).
 Wolves Eat Dogs (2004) by Martin Cruz Smith (crime novel featuring characters affected by the events of the Chernobyl disaster, written as a murder mystery ending on an ambiguous note; the book discusses effects of radiation poisoning on ordinary people, including infertility).

Comics and graphic novels
The Lost Child of Chernobyl: A Graphic Novel by Helen Bate.

See also
 List of Chernobyl-related articles
 List of books about nuclear issues

References

Books about the Chernobyl disaster